Chancellor House is a law office building situated at 25 Fox Street, Ferreirasdorp, Johannesburg, that once housed the Mandela and Tambo law firm of Nelson Mandela and Oliver Tambo. It is a national heritage site.

The building was due to be bought by the Johannesburg Heritage Trust in 2004 
and developed into a tourist destination, with R300 000 earmarked for the construction of a visitor center.

As of 2008, however, no purchase had been consummated and the building reportedly continued to fall into ruin.

Full restoration of the building was completed in May, 2011.

References 

Monuments and memorials in South Africa
Nelson Mandela
Office buildings in Johannesburg
Law offices
Museums in Johannesburg
Legal history of South Africa